Amedeo Benedetti may refer to:

 Amedeo Benedetti (writer) (1954–2017), Italian writer
 Amedeo Benedetti (footballer) (born 1991), Italian footballer